Puisortoq is a glacier on the east coast of Greenland. It has been in a status of retreat for the past years.

It is a very active glacier protruding into the sea and discharging great amounts of ice, making navigation along the coast dangerous.

Geography
Puisortoq is located in the King Frederick VI Coast, the remote and uninhabited southeastern shore of Greenland.

This glacier was dreaded by the Inuit because large fragments of ice would break underwater and shoot to the surface like projectiles, hence its name meaning "where the ice rises to the surface". The local Inuit advised Gino Watkins:

See also
List of glaciers in Greenland

References

External links
 Vulnerability of Southeast Greenland Glaciers to Warm Atlantic Water From Operation IceBridge and Ocean Melting Greenland Data
Glaciers of Greenland